Vino Inès Nrehy Tia (born 1 October 1993), also known as Inès Tia, is an Ivorian women's football forward who plays for the WK League side Changnyeong WFC. She was part of the Ivorian squad for the 2015 FIFA Women's World Cup.

Playing career

Club
Tia began her footballer career at AS Juventus Yopougon in her country, where she played between 2010 and 2012. In the 2013–14 Serbian SuperLiga season, she was with the ŽFK Spartak Subotica, which became league champion. She transferred to the Khimki-based WFC Rossiyanka ln Russia by April 2015. She played two seasons with WFC Rossiyanka scoring eight goals in 28 matches. At the end of the 2016 season, she enjoyed her team's champion title. She played for WFC Rossiyanka in four matches of the 2016–17 UEFA Women's Champions League.

In February 2017, Tia moved to Turkey and signed with the Istanbul-based Beşiktaş J.K. to play in the second half of the Tutkish Women's First League season.

In March 2018, Tia left Turkey for South Korea. She joined Gyeongju KHNP WFC to play in the 2018 WK League.

International
Tia played for the Ivory Coast women's national football team, and represented the nation at the 2012 and 2014 African Women's Championship and the 2015 FIFA Women's World Cup.

Career statistics

Honours

Club
ŽFK Spartak Subotica
Serbian Women's Super League: 2013–14

WFC Rossiyanka
Russian Championship: 2016; runner-up: 2015

Beşiktaş J.K.
Turkish Women's First Football League runner-up: 2016–17

Gyeongju KHNP WFC
WK League runner-up: 2018,  2020, 2021

International
Ivory Coast
African Women's Championship third place: 2014

See also
List of Ivory Coast women's international footballers

References

External links
 
 
 Profile at FIF 

1993 births
Living people
People from Daloa
Ivorian women's footballers
Women's association football forwards
ŽFK Spartak Subotica players
WFC Rossiyanka players
Beşiktaş J.K. women's football players
WK League players
Ivory Coast women's international footballers
2015 FIFA Women's World Cup players
Ivorian expatriate women's footballers
Expatriate women's footballers in Serbia
Ivorian expatriate sportspeople in Serbia
Expatriate women's footballers in Russia
Ivorian expatriate sportspeople in Russia
Expatriate women's footballers in Turkey
Ivorian expatriate sportspeople in Turkey
Expatriate women's footballers in South Korea
Ivorian expatriate sportspeople in South Korea